Chris Gowans (born 13 March 1977) is a former Australian rules football player who played for Central District in the South Australian National Football League.

Career
Chris Gowans was recruited from Werribee Football Club to the St Kilda Football Club of the Australian Football League with the 25th selection in the 1999 Rookie Draft.  He failed to play a senior game at St Kilda, so moved to Central District along with twin brother James Gowans, both players league debuting in 2000. He is the only player to win the Jack Oatey Medal twice.

Chris, along with twin brother James, has played in an unprecedented 17 consecutive Grand Finals (1995 - 97 with Anglesea, 1998 with Werribee, 1999 with St Kilda Reserves, 2000 - 11 with Central District).

References

External links

1977 births
Living people
Central District Football Club players
Werribee Football Club players
Australian rules footballers from Victoria (Australia)
South Australian Football Hall of Fame inductees
Australian twins
Twin sportspeople